Events from the year 1894 in Canada.

Incumbents

Crown 
 Monarch – Victoria

Federal government 
 Governor General – The Earl of Aberdeen 
 Prime Minister – John Thompson (until December 12) then Mackenzie Bowell (from December 21)
 Parliament – 7th
 Chief Justice – Samuel Henry Strong (Ontario)

Provincial governments

Lieutenant governors 
Lieutenant Governor of British Columbia – Edgar Dewdney 
Lieutenant Governor of Manitoba – John Christian Schultz 
Lieutenant Governor of New Brunswick – John James Fraser 
Lieutenant Governor of Nova Scotia – Malachy Bowes Daly   
Lieutenant Governor of Ontario – George Airey Kirkpatrick 
Lieutenant Governor of Prince Edward Island – Jedediah Slason Carvell (until February 14) then George William Howlan (from February 21)
Lieutenant Governor of Quebec – Joseph-Adolphe Chapleau

Premiers    
Premier of British Columbia – Theodore Davie
Premier of Manitoba – Thomas Greenway 
Premier of New Brunswick – Andrew George Blair  
Premier of Nova Scotia – William Stevens Fielding  
Premier of Ontario – Oliver Mowat    
Premier of Prince Edward Island – Frederick Peters 
Premier of Quebec – Louis-Olivier Taillon

Territorial governments

Lieutenant governors 
 Lieutenant Governor of Keewatin – John Christian Schultz
 Lieutenant Governor of the North-West Territories – Charles Herbert Mackintosh

Premiers 
 Chairman of the Executive Committee of the North-West Territories – Frederick Haultain

Events
January 1 – the town of Calgary is incorporated as a city
February 20 – Manitoba Schools Question: The Supreme Court refuses to hear the appeal of Manitoba francophones.
April 27 – Canada's largest known landslide occurs in Saint-Alban, Quebec. It displaced  of rock and dirt and left a  scar that covered .
May 17 – Pioneers' Obelisk (Montreal) unveiled 
June 14 – Massey Hall opens in Toronto.
June 26 – 1894 Ontario election: Sir Oliver Mowat's Liberals win a seventh majority.
June 28 – July 9 – Colonial Conference of 1894 held in Ottawa.
September 3 – Labour Day celebrated for the first time in Canada.
October 31 – The third election of the North-West Legislative Assembly.
December 12 – Prime Minister Sir John Thompson, dies of a heart attack at Windsor Castle, just hours after Queen Victoria inducted him to the Privy Council of the United Kingdom.
December 21 – Mackenzie Bowell becomes prime minister.

Full date unknown 
Rondeau Provincial Park is established in southwestern Ontario.
St. Albert cheese factory is founded.

Arts and literature
Toronto Mendelssohn Choir is founded.

Sport
March 22 – Montreal Hockey Club defeats Ottawa to win the first Stanley Cup challenge.

Births

January to June
January 3 – James Lorimer Ilsley, politician, Minister and jurist (d.1967)
January 5 – Norman MacKenzie, author, lawyer, professor and Senator (d.1986)
February 8 – Billy Bishop, First World War flying ace (d.1956)
May 7 – George A. Drew, politician and 14th Premier of Ontario (d.1973)
May 13 – William Earl Rowe, politician and 20th Lieutenant Governor of Ontario (d.1984)
May 29 – Beatrice Lillie, comic actress (d.1989) 
June 4 – La Bolduc, singer and musician (d.1941)
June 5 – Roy Thomson, 1st Baron Thomson of Fleet, newspaper proprietor and media entrepreneur (d.1976)

July to December
July 17 – Phillip Garratt, aviator
July 24 – Theobald Butler Barrett, politician
July 25 – Norman McLeod Rogers, lawyer, politician and Cabinet minister (d.1940)
August – Gladys Porter, politician and first female member of the Legislative Assembly of Nova Scotia (d.1967)
September 9 – Humphrey Mitchell, politician and trade unionist (d.1950) 
September 10 – H. H. Wrong, diplomat (d.1954)
October 7 – Del Lord, film director and actor (d.1970)
November 5 – Harold Innis, professor of political economy and author (d.1952)
November 13 – James Allan, politician (d.1992)
November 26 – James Charles McGuigan, Cardinal (d.1974)
December 13 – Chester Ronning, diplomat and politician (d.1984)

Deaths

March 19 – John Langton, businessman, political figure and civil servant (b.1808) 
April 16 – Joseph-Charles Taché, a Canadian noted for his contributions to many aspects of the fabric of Canada (b.1820) 
May 27 – Francis Godschall Johnson, politician (b.1817) 
June 22 – Alexandre-Antonin Taché, Roman Catholic priest, missionary, author and Archbishop (b.1823)
September 5 – James Macleod, militia officer, lawyer, police officer, magistrate, judge and politician (b.1836)
September 14 – Narcisse-Fortunat Belleau, lawyer, businessman and politician (b.1808)
September 15 – Philip Carteret Hill, politician and Premier of Nova Scotia (b.1821)
October 30 – Honoré Mercier, lawyer, journalist, politician and Premier of Quebec (b.1840) 
November 28 – Patrick Leonard MacDougall, General and author (b.1819)
November 29 – Charles Stanley Monck, 4th Viscount Monck, Governor General (b.1819) 
December 12 – John Sparrow David Thompson, lawyer, judge, politician, university professor and 4th Prime Minister of Canada (b.1845)

Historical documents

Prime Minister John Thompson's invitation to his Imperial Privy Council swearing-in at Windsor Castle

Prime Minister John Thompson's death at Windsor Castle, and Queen Victoria's response

Ethnologist crashes Dogribs' three-week muskox hunt

Chignecto Ship Railway would shorten voyages of eastern New Brunswick, P.E.I. and other shipping to U.S.A.

References
  

 
Years of the 19th century in Canada
Canada
1894 in North America